The Swedish Stone Workers' Union (Sten) was a trade union representing stonemasons and related workers in Sweden.

The union was founded in 1897, as the Swedish branch of the Scandinavian Stonemasons' Union.  In 1898, it became independent, and established headquarters in Lysekil.  It affiliated to the Swedish Trade Union Confederation and grew rapidly, having 5,870 members by 1908.  It reached a peak membership of 11,516 in 1930, and then steadily declined.  By 1969, it had only 2,939 members.  The following year, it was dissolved, with the majority of members transferring to the Swedish Factory Workers' Union, while a minority who worked in the construction industry instead joined the Swedish Building Workers' Union.

References

Swedish Trade Union Confederation
Stonemasons' trade unions
Trade unions in Sweden
Trade unions established in 1897
Trade unions disestablished in 1970